Dendrolaelaps sitalaensis is a species of mite in the family Digamasellidae.

References

Digamasellidae